"This Is the Record of John" is a verse anthem written by the English composer Orlando Gibbons (1583—1625).  It is based on a text from the Gospel of John in the Geneva Bible and is a characteristic Anglican-style composition of its time. "John" (whose record is being told) refers to John the Baptist. 
The piece is divided into three sections, each beginning with a verse for solo contratenor (more like a modern tenor, but often now sung by a countertenor) followed by a full section (consort of voices), echoing words of the verse.
The singers are usually accompanied by organ: a viol consort is another possibility, although it is debatable how frequently viols would have been used in Jacobean services.

History
This 'verse-anthem' was written at the request of William Laud, who was president of St John's College, Oxford, from 1611 to 1621; the St John to whom college is dedicated is John the Baptist.  It was written for the college chapel, and presumably received its first performance there. The text forms one of the readings for Advent.

According to Morris, the earliest known extant manuscripts of the anthem date from the 1630s, a decade after Gibbons' death.  They are located at major English cathedrals and chapels, as far from Oxford as Durham, suggesting that the anthem enjoyed wide use when first written.  It is included in a number of modern publications, including the Oxford Book of Tudor Anthems (OUP, 1978).

Sources
The original text comes from John 1:19–23.  Gibbons uses the text of the Geneva Bible; it is very similar to that found in the Authorized Version, but (for example) AV has "one crying" in the third stanza, where the Geneva Bible (and Gibbons) have "him that crieth".  The text concerns the prophecy of John the Baptist foretelling the coming of Jesus.

Verses

References

External links
 - St Mary Magdalene's choir and viol consort

Advent music
Anthems
Christian songs
Compositions by Orlando Gibbons
John the Baptist